Charles Jewson was the Chief Cashier of the Bank of England from 1775 to 1777. Jewson was replaced as Chief Cashier by Henry Hase.

References

Chief Cashiers of the Bank of England
18th-century British businesspeople
Year of birth missing
Year of death missing